Beggars and Choosers may refer to:

 Beggars and Choosers (novel), a 1994 novel by Nancy Kress
 Beggars and Choosers (TV series), a 1999-2000 American comedy-drama series 
 "Beggars and Choosers", a song by Soul Asylum from Hang Time
 Choosey Beggar, song